Ian Gerald Harnett (13 December 1926 – June 2001) was a Scottish amateur football right back who made over 300 appearances in the Scottish League for Queen's Park. He also served on the club's committee and as president. He was capped by Scotland at amateur level.

Personal life 
Harnett was educated at St Joseph's College, Dumfries and studied engineering at Glasgow University. He also played cricket for Forfarshire and Kilmarnock.

Honours 
Queens Park
Scottish League Second Division: 1955–56

References

Scottish footballers
Scottish Football League players
Queen's Park F.C. players
Place of birth missing
1926 births
Association football fullbacks
2001 deaths
Scotland amateur international footballers
Lochee Harp F.C. players
Alumni of the University of Glasgow
People educated at St Joseph's College, Dumfries